June Foray (born June Lucille Forer; September 18, 1917 – July 26, 2017) was an American voice actress. She was best known as the voice of such animated characters as Rocky the Flying Squirrel, Natasha Fatale, Nell Fenwick, Lucifer from Disney's Cinderella, Cindy Lou Who, Jokey Smurf, Granny from the Warner Bros. cartoons directed by Friz Freleng, Grammi Gummi from Disney's Adventures of the Gummi Bears series, and Magica De Spell, among many others.

Her career encompassed radio, theatrical shorts, feature films, television, records (particularly with Stan Freberg), video games, talking toys, and other media. Foray was also one of the early members of ASIFA-Hollywood, the society devoted to promoting and encouraging animation. She is credited with the establishment of the Annie Awards, as well as being instrumental in the creation of the Academy Award for Best Animated Feature in 2001. She has a star on the Hollywood Walk of Fame honoring her voice work in television.

Chuck Jones was quoted as saying: "June Foray is not the female Mel Blanc. Mel Blanc was the male June Foray."

Early life
June Lucille Forer was born on September 18, 1917, in Springfield, Massachusetts, one of three children of Ida (Robinson) and Morris Forer. Her mother was of Lithuanian Jewish and French Canadian ancestry, and her father was a Jewish emigrant from Odessa, Russian Empire. The family resided at 75 Orange Street, Forest Park. As a small child, Foray first wanted to be a dancer, so her mother sent her to local classes, but she had to drop out due to a case of pneumonia. Her voice was first broadcast in a local radio drama when she was 12 years old; by age 15, she was doing regular radio voice work.

Two years later, after graduating from Classical High School, she moved with her parents and siblings to live in Los Angeles, near Ida's brother, after Morris Forer, an engineer, fell on hard financial times.

Acting career
After entering radio through the WBZA Players, Foray starred in her own radio series Lady Make Believe in the late 1930s. She soon became a popular voice actress, with regular appearances on coast-to-coast network shows including Lux Radio Theatre and The Jimmy Durante Show.

In the 1940s, Foray also began film work, including a few roles in live action movies, but mostly did voice over work for animated cartoons and radio programs and occasionally dubbing films and television. On radio, Foray did the voices of Midnight the Cat and Old Grandie the Piano on The Buster Brown Program, which starred Smilin' Ed McConnell, from 1944 to 1952. She later did voices on the Mutual Broadcasting System program Smile Time for Steve Allen. Her work in radio ultimately led her to recording for a number of children's albums for Capitol Records.

For Walt Disney, Foray voiced Lucifer the Cat in the feature film Cinderella, Lambert's mother in Lambert the Sheepish Lion, a mermaid in Peter Pan and Witch Hazel in the Donald Duck short Trick or Treat. Decades later, Foray was the voice of Grandmother Fa in the 1998 animated Disney film Mulan. She also did a variety of voices in Walter Lantz Productions' Woody Woodpecker cartoons, including Woody's nephew and niece, Knothead and Splinter. Impressed by her performance as Witch Hazel, in 1954 Chuck Jones invited her over to Warner Brothers Cartoons. For Warner Brothers, she was Granny (whom she had played on vinyl records starting in 1950, before officially voicing her in Red Riding Hoodwinked, released in 1955, taking over for Bea Benaderet), owner of Tweety and Sylvester, and a series of witches, including Looney Tunes' own Witch Hazel, with Jones as director. Like most of Warner Brothers' voice actors at the time (with the exception of Mel Blanc), Foray was not credited for her roles in these cartoons. She played Bubbles on The Super 6 and Cindy Lou Who, asking "Santa" why he's taking their tree, in How the Grinch Stole Christmas. In 1960, she provided the speech for Mattel's original "Chatty Cathy" doll; capitalizing on this, Foray also voiced the malevolent "Talky Tina" doll in the Twilight Zone episode "Living Doll", first aired on November 1, 1963.

Foray worked for Hanna-Barbera, including on Scooby-Doo, Where Are You!, The Jetsons, The Flintstones and many other shows. In 1959, she auditioned for the part of Betty Rubble on The Flintstones and voiced the character in the original pilot episode, opposite Mel Blanc who voiced Betty's husband, Barney Rubble, but Bea Benaderet was eventually cast in the role; Foray described herself as "terribly disappointed" at not getting to play Betty. Foray eventually made a guest appearance on The Flintstones as the voice of Granny Hatrock in the episode "The Bedrock Hillbillies".

She did extensive voice acting for Stan Freberg's commercials, albums, and 1957 radio series, memorably as secretary to the werewolf advertising executive. She also appeared in several Rankin/Bass TV specials in the 1960s and 1970s, voicing the young Karen and the teacher in the TV special Frosty the Snowman (although only her Karen singing parts remained in later airings, after Rankin-Bass re-edited the special a few years after it debuted, with Foray's dialogue re-dubbed by an uncredited child actress, Suzanne Davidson). She voiced all the female roles in Rikki-Tikki-Tavi (1975), including the villainous cobra Nagaina. She played multiple characters on The Rocky and Bullwinkle Show, including Natasha Fatale and Nell Fenwick, as well as male lead character Rocket J. Squirrel (a.k.a. Rocky Squirrel) for Jay Ward, and played Ursula on George of the Jungle; and also starred on Fractured Flickers.

In the mid-1960s, she became devoted to the preservation and promotion of animation and wrote numerous magazine articles about animation. She and a number of other animation artists had informal meetings around Hollywood in the 1960s, and later decided to formalize this as ASIFA-Hollywood, a chapter of the Association Internationale du Film d'Animation (the International Animated Film Association). She is credited with coming up with the idea of the Annie Awards in 1972, awarded by ASIFA-Hollywood, having noted that there had been no awards to celebrate the field of animation. In 1988, she was awarded the Bob Clampett Humanitarian Award. In 1995, ASIFA-Hollywood established the June Foray Award, which is awarded to "individuals who have made a significant and benevolent or charitable impact on the art and industry of animation". Foray was the first recipient of the award. She was an enthusiastic member of the Los Angeles Student Film Institute advisory board and frequent host and/or presenter at its annual festivals. In 2007, Foray became a contributor to ASIFA-Hollywood's Animation Archive Project. She also had sat on the Governors' board for the Academy of Motion Picture Arts & Sciences and lobbied for two decades for the academy to establish an Academy Award for animation; the academy created the Academy Award for Best Animated Feature in 2001 from her petitioning.

In 2007, Britt Irvin became the first person ever to voice a character in a cartoon remake that had been previously played by Foray in the original series when she voiced Ursula in the new George of the Jungle series on Cartoon Network. In 2011, Roz Ryan voiced Witch Lezah (Hazel spelled backwards) in The Looney Tunes Show, opposite June Foray as Granny. Foray also voiced May Parker in Spider-Man and His Amazing Friends (1981–83), as well as Raggedy Ann on several TV movies, Grandma Howard on Teen Wolf, Jokey Smurf and Mother Nature on The Smurfs, and Magica De Spell and Ma Beagle in DuckTales. At the same time, she had a leading role voicing Grammi Gummi on Disney's Adventures of the Gummi Bears, an animated series credited with kickstarting an era of dramatically increased artistic standards for television animation, working with her Rocky and Bullwinkle co-star Bill Scott until his death in 1985.

Foray guest starred only once on The Simpsons, in the season one episode "Some Enchanted Evening", as the receptionist for the Rubber Baby Buggy Bumper Babysitting Service. This was a play on a Rocky & Bullwinkle gag years earlier in which none of the cartoon's characters, including narrator William Conrad, were able to pronounce "rubber baby buggy bumpers" unerringly. Foray was later homaged by The Simpsons, in the season eight episode "The Itchy & Scratchy & Poochie Show", in which the character June Bellamy (voiced by Tress MacNeille) is introduced as the voice behind both Itchy and Scratchy. According to The Simpsons writer and producer Mike Reiss, Foray voiced a few parts at the first table read for The Simpsons in early 1989 "but she sounded too cartoony for our show".

Foray appeared on camera in a major role only once, in Sabaka, as the high priestess of a fire cult. She also appeared on camera in an episode of Green Acres as a Mexican telephone operator. In 1991, she provided her voice as the sock-puppet talk-show host Scary Mary on an episode of Married... with Children. She had a cameo role in Boris & Natasha (1992), but once again played Rocky and Natasha throughout the feature film The Adventures of Rocky and Bullwinkle (2000). Another on-camera appearance was as herself on an episode of the 1984 TV sitcom The Duck Factory.

She was also often called in for ADR voice work for television and feature films. This work included dubbing the voice of Mary Badham in Twilight Zone episode "The Bewitchin' Pool" and the voices for Sean and Michael Brody in some scenes of the film Jaws. She dubbed several people in Bells Are Ringing, Diana Rigg in some scenes of The Hospital, Robert Blake in drag in an episode of Baretta and a little boy in The Comic.

Later career
In 1996 and 1997, Foray won the Annie Award for Outstanding Individual Achievement for Voice Acting by a Female Performer in an Animated Television Production for her work in Sylvester and Tweety Mysteries. In 2000, Foray returned to play Rocky the Flying Squirrel in Universal Pictures' live-action/CGI animated film The Adventures of Rocky and Bullwinkle, co-starring and produced by Robert De Niro. On Season Three, Episode One ("The Thin White Line") of Family Guy, Foray again played Rocky in a visual gag with a single line ("And now, here's something we hope you'll really like!"). Foray voiced the wife of the man getting dunked ("Don't tell him, Carlos!") in Pirates of the Caribbean. In 2003, she guest starred as the villain Madame Argentina in the Powerpuff Girls episode, "I See a Funny Cartoon in Your Future". During this time, Foray also had a regular role, reprising Granny on Baby Looney Tunes and also Witch Hazel in an episode of another Warner Bros. Animation series Duck Dodgers. In October 2006, she portrayed Susan B. Anthony on three episodes of the podcast The Radio Adventures of Dr. Floyd. In November 2009, Foray appeared twice on The Marvelous Misadventures of Flapjack: in one episode as Ruth, a pie-maker trapped in Bubbie's stomach, and in another episode as Kelly, a young boy having a birthday party and as Kelly's Mom and Captain K'Nuckles' kindergarten teacher.

In 2011, she reprised her role as Granny in Cartoon Network's The Looney Tunes Show, which was her last regular gig. That year, she received the Comic-Con Icon Award at the 2011 Scream Awards. She also appeared as Granny in the theatrically released Looney Tunes short, I Tawt I Taw a Puddy Tat, which was shortlisted for Academy Award consideration.

In 2012, Foray received her first Emmy nomination and won in the category of Outstanding Performer in an Animated Program for her role as Mrs. Cauldron on The Garfield Show. She thus became, at age 94, the oldest entertainer to be nominated for, and to win, an Emmy Award. She reprised her role of Rocky in a Rocky and Bullwinkle short film, which was released in 2014.

In September 2013, she was honored with the Governors Award at the 65th Primetime Creative Arts Emmy Awards. That same year, she reprised her role as Magica De Spell in the video game DuckTales: Remastered.

Personal life
Foray married Bernard Barondess in 1941. The marriage ended in divorce. She met Hobart Donovan while appearing on The Buster Brown Program on radio. He was the show's main writer and had also written The Buster Brown comic book. Foray and Donovan were married from 1955 until Donovan's death in 1976. She had no children by either marriage.

In 1973, Foray was an organizer of a meat boycott in response to President Nixon's freezing of meat (and other) prices. As a result of this, Foray was included in the Master list of Nixon's political opponents, commonly known as Nixon's Enemies List.

Death
Foray died at a hospital in Los Angeles, California, on July 26, 2017, at the age of 99. She had been in declining health since an automobile accident in 2015.

Credits

Radio

Film

Live action

Television

Video games

References

Further reading
June Foray with Mark Evanier and Earl Kress. Did You Grow Up with Me, Too?: The Autobiography of June Foray. BearManor Media, 2009.

External links

 
 
 
 
 

1917 births
2017 deaths
Actresses from Massachusetts
American radio actresses
American video game actresses
Animal impersonators
Annie Award winners
Audiobook narrators
Daytime Emmy Award winners
Bob Clampett Humanitarian Award winners
20th-century American actresses
21st-century American actresses
Actors from Springfield, Massachusetts
Disney people
Warner Bros. Cartoons voice actors
Hanna-Barbera people
Jewish American actresses
American people of French-Canadian descent
American people of Lithuanian-Jewish descent
American people of Russian-Jewish descent
Looney Tunes
Nixon's Enemies List
Inkpot Award winners
California Democrats
Massachusetts Democrats
Metro-Goldwyn-Mayer cartoon studio people
Walter Lantz Productions people